Gerald O'Carroll is an Irish writer and historian. Born in Tralee, County Kerry in 1952, he is the second of ten children of James, an insurance broker, and his wife Elizabeth (née Talbot). Gerald was educated at Catholic primary schools in Tralee and Castlemaine, where the family moved about 1961. He attended the Catholic St. Brendan's College, Killarney, before going to University College Cork, where he graduated with a BA in history, English, and geography in 1972. He taught at second level under the Limerick City Vocational Education Committee, and for short spells on secondment in Bulawayo, Zimbabwe (1983–85) and Madrid, Spain (1991). O'Carroll retired from teaching in 1997 to concentrate on research and publication.

All of O'Carroll's published works draw their inspiration from the history of southwest Ireland, particularly County Kerry, with particular emphasis on the 12th century Norman settlement and the later Elizabethan and seventeenth-century settlements. These interests informed his first book, the writings of Mr. Justice Robert Day, a Kerry native and Dublin-based member of the court of King's Bench. He next undertook the writing of a history of Tralee. Recognising the need for such a publication, he made contact with Sir Anthony Denny, who was descended from the leading Elizabethan planter of the region, and who placed important archive material at his disposal. The resulting book revealed the restrictive town charter of pre-democratic days, but assessed the positive contributions of settler representatives- Blennerhassett, Rowan and Denny included.
 
O'Carroll's book on the Geraldine earls of Desmond, published in 2013, was the culmination of over thirty years of interest in the subject. Like his previous books, it drew its inspiration from the fact of historical continuity: despite war, including the occasional massacre in Elizabethan and Cromwellian times, by the nineteenth century the blood of the Geraldine earls was running in the veins of some of the settler families who composed the regional elite. This awareness had been forgotten by historians working within the confines of recent nationalism. O'Carroll lives in Limerick.

Works
Mr. Justice Robert Day (1746–1841), the Diaries and the Addresses to Grand Juries (2004);
The Pocket History of Kerry (2007);
The History of Tralee, Its Charter and Governance (2009);
The Earls of Desmond, The Rise and Fall of a Munster Lordship (2013)

References

External links
 blog: www.historytralee.wordpress.com

Irish writers
21st-century Irish historians
People from County Kerry
Alumni of University College Cork
Year of birth missing (living people)
Living people